The 2005 Uzbek League season was the 14th edition of top level football in Uzbekistan since independence from the Soviet Union in 1992.

Overview
It was contested by 14 teams, and Pakhtakor Tashkent won the championship.

League table

Relegation play-off

Season statistics

Top goalscorers

References
Uzbekistan - List of final tables (RSSSF)

Uzbekistan Super League seasons
1
Uzbek
Uzbek